Weaver is a city in Calhoun County, Alabama, United States. At the 2020 census, the population was 3,339. It is included in the Anniston-Oxford, Alabama Metropolitan Statistical Area.

Geography

Demographics

2020 census

As of the 2020 United States census, there were 3,339 people, 1,061 households, and 800 families residing in the city.

2019
As of the census of 2019, there were 5,771 people, 2011 households, and 1558 families residing in the city. The population density was 77 people per square mile (338.5/km). The racial makeup of the city was 81.4% White, 13.6% Black or African American, 0.7% Native American, 1.1% Asian, 0.3% Pacific Islander, 0.5% from other races, and 2.5% from two or more races. 3.0% of the population were Hispanic or Latino of any race.

There were 2011 households, out of which 84.4% had children under the age of 18 living with them, 51.8% were married couples living together, 17.3% had a female householder with no husband present, and 26.9% were non-families. 23.2% of all households were made up of individuals, and 8.8% had someone living alone who was 65 years of age or older. The average household size was 2.61 and the average family size was 3.06.

In the city, the population was spread out, with 27.0% under the age of 18, 7.8% from 18 to 24, 28.9% from 25 to 44, 24.8% from 45 to 64, and 11.5% who were 65 years of age or older. The median age was 34.5 years. For every 100 females, there were 87.6 males. For every 100 females age 18 and over, there were 84.1 males.

The median income for a household in the city was $40,791, and the median income for a family was $48,478. Males had a median income of $34,125 versus $25,573 for females. The per capita income for the city was $20,078. About 10.9% of families and 11.5% of the population were below the poverty line, including 12.2% of those under age 18 and 5.1% of those age 65 or over.

Government

Past (2017) the mayor of the City of Weaver was Wayne Willis.

Currently (2021) the mayor of the City of Weaver is Jeff Clendenning.

Education
Weaver is home to two public schools:
Weaver High School (Grades 7-12)
Weaver Elementary School (Grades K-6)

The public schools in Weaver are run by Calhoun County Schools. Weaver High School's sports teams, the Bearcats, compete in Class 3A of the Alabama High School Athletic Association (AHSAA).

Weaver High School has served as a cornerstone and community center for Weaver, Alabama since 1968. The school holds various AHSAA records but none as dominating as the 221 consecutive boys wrestling dual-meet wins. A 27th individual state title was won by Christian Cortez, making him the fourth ASHAA state champion under Andy Fulmer. Others to receive state titles within the Fulmer era are Jake Taylor, Daren Allison and DeAnthony Smith.

Notable person
Sandra Woodley, president of the University of Louisiana System

References

External links
City of Weaver official website

Cities in Alabama
Cities in Calhoun County, Alabama